William Henry Thomas Sylvester VC (16 April 1831 – 13 March 1920) was an English recipient of the Victoria Cross, the highest and most prestigious award for gallantry in the face of the enemy that can be awarded to British and Commonwealth forces.

Details
Sylvester was 24 years old, and an assistant surgeon in the 23rd Regiment of Foot (later The Royal Welch Fusiliers), British Army during the Crimean War when the following deed took place for which he was awarded the VC.

On 8 September 1855, at Sebastopol, Crimea, near the Redan, Assistant Surgeon Sylvester went with a corporal (Robert Shields) to the aid of an officer who was mortally wounded and remained with him, dressing his wounds, in a most dangerous and exposed situation. Again, on 18 September this officer was at the front, under heavy fire, attending the wounded.

Further information
He later achieved the rank of surgeon major and was the last surviving VC holder of the Crimean War. He was reputed to have worked with Florence Nightingale.

The medal
His Victoria Cross is displayed at the Army Medical Services Museum, Mytchett, Surrey.

References

External links
Location of grave and VC medal (Devonshire)
 

1831 births
1920 deaths
Burials in Devon
British recipients of the Victoria Cross
Crimean War recipients of the Victoria Cross
British Army personnel of the Crimean War
Royal Welch Fusiliers officers
British Army regimental surgeons
Military personnel from Wiltshire
People from Devizes
Chevaliers of the Légion d'honneur
British military personnel of the Indian Rebellion of 1857
King's Own Scottish Borderers officers
British Army recipients of the Victoria Cross
Alumni of the University of Edinburgh